Riazi is a surname of Iranian origins.

People with this name include:

 Abdollah Riazi (1905–1979), Iranian politician
 Atefeh Riazi, American information technologist and public administrator
 Shokouh Riazi (1921–1962), Iranian modernist painter, educator

Surnames of Iranian origin